Virtaal is a computer-assisted translation tool written in the Python programming language.  It is free software developed and maintained by Translate.org.za.

Virtaal is built using the Translate Toolkit allowing it to process a number of translation and localisation formats.

Design Philosophy 

The key principle behind the design of Virtaal is the optimisation of the interface for the localiser.  This includes ensuring that all relevant functionality is keyboard accessible and that needed information is always optimally displayed.

History 

Work on Virtaal began in 2007 with an initial 0.1 release made to a small number of open-source localisers.  Version 0.2, released in October 2008, became the first official release.

Name 

The name Virtaal, pronounced , is a play on words. In Afrikaans, an official language of South Africa where Translate.org.za is located, the expression "vir taal" means "for language", while the word "vertaal" (pronounced the same as "vir taal") means "translate".

Supported source document formats 

Virtaal works directly with any of the bilingual (containing both source and target language) files understood by the Translate Toolkit. This would include XLIFF, Gettext PO and MO, various Qt files (.qm, .ts, .qph), Wordfast translation memory, TBX, TMX and OmegaT glossaries.

Features 

 Simple single view interface
 Colour highlighting
 Autocorrect
 Autocomplete
 In-context segment filtering:
 All segments
 Partial translations and non-translated segments
 All segments matching a search string (includes case-sensitivity and Python regular expressions)
 Search and replace with regular expressions and Unicode normalisation
 Translation memory with several back-ends:
 Local translation memory database (including current file)
 Remote translation memory database (such as an office TM server)
 Open-Tran.eu
 Machine translation through Apertium, Google Translate, Microsoft Translator, Moses or the libtranslate library providing access to several others
 TinyTM
 Terminology help from:
 Automatically downloaded files
 Local terminology files
 Open-Tran.eu
 Recognition and easy insertion of placeables
 Language identification
 Quality checks

See also 
 Computer-assisted Translation
 Pootle
 OmegaT

References

External links 
 

Software-localization tools
Free software programmed in Python
Computer-assisted translation software for Linux
Computer-assisted translation software that uses GTK
Software that uses PyGTK